Fernandezina is a genus of South American palp-footed spiders that was first described by M. Birabén in 1951.

Species
 it contains fifteen species, found only in South America:
Fernandezina acuta Platnick, 1975 – Brazil
Fernandezina andersoni Cala-Riquelme & Agnarsson, 2018 – Colombia
Fernandezina dasilvai Platnick, Grismado & Ramírez, 1999 – Brazil
Fernandezina divisa Platnick, 1975 – Brazil
Fernandezina eduardoi Cala-Riquelme, Quijano-Cuervo & Sabogal-Gonzáles, 2018 – Colombia
Fernandezina grismadoi Martínez & Gutierrez, 2021 – Colombia
Fernandezina ilheus Platnick, Grismado & Ramírez, 1999 – Brazil
Fernandezina jurubatiba Castro, Baptista, Grismado & Ramírez, 2015 – Brazil
Fernandezina maldonado Platnick, Grismado & Ramírez, 1999 – Peru
Fernandezina nica Ott & Ott, 2014 – Brazil
Fernandezina pelta Platnick, 1975 – Brazil
Fernandezina pulchra Birabén, 1951 (type) – Brazil, Bolivia, Argentina
Fernandezina saira Buckup & Ott, 2004 – Brazil
Fernandezina takutu Grismado, 2002 – Guyana
Fernandezina tijuca Ramírez & Grismado, 1996 – Brazil

See also
 List of Palpimanidae species

References

Araneomorphae genera
Palpimanidae
Spiders of South America